Anoncia conia is a moth in the family Cosmopterigidae. It is found in California, United States.

The wingspan is 14–16 mm. The forewings are whitish cinereous (ash-gray), dusted with brownish fuscous. The hindwings are cinereous, with a slight brownish tinge.

References

Cosmopteriginae
Endemic fauna of California
Moths of North America
Moths described in 1907
Fauna without expected TNC conservation status